Scopula eulomata is a moth of the family Geometridae. It is found on Java, Bali, Sumatra, Nias and Japan.

References

Moths described in 1877
eulomata
Moths of Asia